Witomierz  (German: Johannishof) is a village in the administrative district of Gmina Karnice, within Gryfice County, West Pomeranian Voivodeship, in north-western Poland.

References

Witomierz